Greer Stevens and Bob Hewitt were the defending champions but lost in the quarterfinals to Candy Reynolds and Steve Denton.

Wendy Turnbull and Marty Riessen won in the final 7–5, 6–2 against Betty Stöve and Frew McMillan.

Seeds
Champion seeds are indicated in bold text while text in italics indicates the round in which those seeds were eliminated.

Draw

Final

Top half

Bottom half

References
1980 US Open – Doubles draws and results at the International Tennis Federation

Mixed Doubles
US Open (tennis) by year – Mixed doubles